Robert Braybrooke was a medieval Dean of Salisbury and Bishop of London.

Biography
Braybrooke was the son of Sir Gerard Braybrooke of Horsenden, Buckinghamshire & Colmworth, Bedfordshire and his wife, Isabella, the daughter of Sir Roger Dakeny of Clophill. He was nominated 9 September 1381 and consecrated on 5 January 1382.

Braybrooke was named Lord Chancellor of England on 20 September 1382 and was out of the office by 11 July 1383.

Braybrooke accompanied King Richard II to Ireland in 1394  and was Lord Chancellor of Ireland for six months in 1397.

Braybrooke died on 28 August 1404, and was buried in St. Paul's Cathedral. His tomb was smashed during the Great Fire of London in 1666, and his body was found inside intact and mummified.

See also
 Secretary of State (England)
 List of Lord Chancellors and Lord Keepers

Citations

References
 

Deans of Salisbury
Bishops of London
Lord chancellors of England
1404 deaths
People from the Borough of Bedford
People from Wycombe District
Year of birth unknown